Seraji may refer to:
Seraji, Iran, a village in Kerman Province, Iran
Homayoun Seraji (1947–2007), Iranian scientist
Mahbod Seraji (born 1956), American writer
Mahmoud Seraji (1934–2017), Iranian poet and author
Nasrine Seraji (born 1957), Iranian-British architect